A bombing at the Roxas Night Market occurred in Davao City, Philippines, on September 2, 2016, causing at least 14 deaths and 70 injuries. On September 13, 2016, one of those injured, a pregnant woman, died, bringing the death toll up to 15.

Militant Islamic group Abu Sayyaf reportedly claimed responsibility for the bombing but later denied responsibility, claiming that their allies, the Daulat Ul-Islamiya, were responsible for the incident as a show of sympathy to the group. Disgruntled vendors are also being considered as possible perpetrators.

On October 2, 2016, three of the ten suspects were arrested. The arrested are linked to the Maute group which has ties with the Abu Sayyaf.

Background

On August 28, 2016, President Rodrigo Duterte ordered the Armed Forces of the Philippines to capture and eliminate Abu Sayyaf members, after the terrorist group beheaded an 18-year-old boy on August 22, 2016, when the victim's family failed to pay ransom.

On July 7, 2016, Davao City Vice Mayor Paolo Duterte announced that Davao City is facing threats from terror group ISIS, prompting authorities to increase security in the area. He however got criticized for such announcement. After the night market bombing, Duterte admitted he received a bomb threat two days before the incident stating that an attack will occur either in General Santos or Davao City. Duterte opted not to release the info to the public, citing that the bomb threat also told him not to publicize the threat.

Davao City Mayor Sara Duterte-Carpio had previously ordered the popular night market to be closed due to "a number of violations and complaints". It however reopened on August 13 following meetings with the vendors and provided that all vendors follow stricter rules set by the city government.

Attacks
The bombing took place around 22:17 PST at the night market, which is located along Roxas Avenue in the city's central business district, some 100 meters from the main campus of the Ateneo de Davao University. Davao City Vice Mayor Paolo Duterte issued a statement  shortly after the attacks to confirm the report on the number of casualties. He also said it was too early to tell who may be behind the explosion and assured the public that the authorities are on top of the incident.

At the Command Conference of the Police Region Office 11 in Davao the night following the incident, Philippine National Police Director General Ronald dela Rosa confirmed that the Davao blast was a terror attack and that an improvised explosive device was used.

Suspected perpetrators
The Islamist militant group Abu Sayyaf, through its spokesman, reportedly claimed responsibility for the alleged bombing as it called on the mujahideen in the country to unite against the Armed Forces of the Philippines. The group later denied the reports by saying that it was their allies, the Daulat Ul-Islamiya responsible for the explosion saying that the Daulat's actions was to sympathize with the Abu Sayyaf. Its spokesman said that the attacks will not stop unless Duterte were to adopt the hadith as law of the country and he himself seek conversion to Islam.

Before the attack, the terrorist group reportedly vowed retaliation against the Philippine government for launching a major offensive against it recently in Sulu.

The City Government of Davao has offered 3 million pesos bounty for the eventual arrest of the perpetrators. Two million pesos will be given for those who can give information on the whereabouts of the bombing suspects, while another 1 million pesos will be given for those who can arrest and bring the suspects to the authorities.

Individuals
The Philippine National Police's investigation remarked the similarities of the IED used in the bombing to the one used by Abdul Manap Mentang at the 2005 Valentine's Day bombings which was also detonated at the night market. Like in the 2005 bombings, the 2016 bombings used an IED is a mortar shell and fitted with a remote detonator. This finding caused the police to suspect that Mentang, who was at large at the time of the explosion, may be directly involved in the 2016 bombings.

As of 5 September, the PNP had three "persons of interest" in connection with the bombings based from testimonies from witnesses. One of these three persons is a medium-built male in his 40s who was seen leaving a bag under a massage table. The two other persons of interest are female.

On October 4, 2016, three men who are linked to the Maute group were arrested through the joint efforts of the police and armed forces and were presented to the media on October 7. The men were TJ Tagadaya Macabalang, Wendel Apostol Facturan, and Musali Mustapha. Defense Secretary Delfin Lorenzana said that the Maute Group has already established links with the Abu Sayaff and that there are "indications" that the group is aligning themselves with ISIS. There are seven other suspects which were yet to be arrested.

Reactions

Domestic
Government

The Philippine National Police has placed all of its units nationwide under full alert following the attack while the Davao City Police Office has also set up a hotline specifically for use of the victims' relatives.

President Rodrigo Duterte declared a "state of emergency on account of lawless violence" in the Philippines as the whole city of Davao was placed on lockdown. Under the declaration, the Armed Forces of the Philippines are given the authority to conduct law enforcement operations normally done by the Philippine National Police, but unlike martial law, the writ of habeas corpus is not suspended. While no nationwide curfew has been imposed, residents were advised to stay indoors as police and soldiers set up checkpoints and search vehicles and houses. Duterte also postponed a scheduled state visit to Brunei that would have taken place from 4 to 5 September.

Non-state parties
On September 4, 2016, the Communist Party of the Philippines has accused the United States of instigating the bomb attack. In a statement, Siegfried Red of the CPP's Southern Mindanao Regional Party Committee claimed Washington planned the bombing to derail the peace talks between the communist party and the Duterte administration. The communist group has accused the Central Intelligence Agency in particular with collaborating with critics of the peace talks, ultra-rightists groups linked to the Armed Forces of the Philippines, and drug lords.

International
Countries
The United States through the US National Security Council expressed readiness to coordinate with local authorities regarding the investigation of the incident and offered condolences to the relatives of the victims of the blast. Australia, Brunei, Cambodia, China, France, Indonesia, Japan, Malaysia, Singapore, South Korea, Spain and Vietnam also expressed their condolences and condemning the attack. Similarly, Israel, through their embassy in the country expressed condolences to the victims and wishes speedy recovery to the injured.

The governments of Canada, China, Singapore, Taiwan, The United Kingdom and The United States issued travel warnings to its citizens, while Australia reiterated its travel warning in the area.

Others
Human rights group Amnesty International acknowledged the tragedy and extended its condolences to the victims.

Facebook activated its Safety Check feature hours after the bombing.

Other bombings
Two separate bomb attacks struck North Cotabato and South Cotabato provinces on Saturday.

Impact of the Incident
The Miss Universe 2016 which bid and scheduled to be hosted in the Philippines has delayed by the Miss Universe organization to the date: January 30, 2017, due to "security reasons".

See also
 Crimes committed by the Abu Sayyaf network
 List of terrorist incidents in September 2016

References

2016 in the Philippines
History of Davao City
Improvised explosive device bombings in the Philippines
Islamic terrorism in the Philippines
Mass murder in 2016
September 2016 crimes in Asia
2016 murders in the Philippines
Terrorist incidents in the Philippines in 2016